James Barclay (born 1965) is a British high fantasy author. He has written two trilogies, Chronicles of the Raven and Legends of the Raven, and a related novella, Light Stealer.

His latest project is a new series titled The Ascendants of Estorea. The first book, Cry of the Newborn, was published in October 2005.  The sequel, A Shout for the Dead was published in January 2007, which was late due to publication delays.

Biography 

James Barclay was born on 15 March 1965, shortly after midday. For 18 years he lived in Felixstowe, Suffolk with his parents (Thea and Keith), two sisters (Nancy and Virginia) and an older brother (Mike).

Barclay's love for writing spawned from a love for reading. His brother introduced him to the genres of Sci-Fi and Fantasy, and he began to play role playing games enthusiastically. From reading many books from the genre, Barclay began to write from the age of 11. The first story which he wrote (at the age of 13) was called "Troja: Dawn". Barclay claims "it was and is utterly awful". After this came his second effort at the age of 15, titled "What Price, Civilization?".

At the age of 18, Barclay moved to Sheffield City Polytechnic to study Electronics Control and Design Engineering. After two weeks he changed from Science to Arts, taking up Communication Studies. His first published work came at this time in a local journal.

By the end of his course, Barclay had decided to become an actor, and moved to London to do a post graduate course in Performing Arts. Since leaving the course, he has been a part in a small number of student films, and several works of amateur dramatics.

The first full manuscript which Barclay wrote had its roots in the earlier sci-fi/fantasy fusion genre. It was entitled "The All-God's gift" and was not published.

After multiple jobs from the age of 23, including a parcel delivery driver (where he lasted just nine weeks) he left Insight Investment in March 2004 to write full-time.

Barclay never stopped writing and submitting, and in May 1998 he achieved success when he found out he was going to be published. The first book of seven about The Raven, Dawnthief, was published in the UK in 1999. Since then he has gone on to write a number of books regarding the raven, and also his new duology The Ascendants of Estorea.

Barclay is married to Clare, and they live in Surrey with their two boys, Oscar and Ollie.

Bibliography

The Raven
The Chronicles of the Raven is primarily set on Balaia and revolves around a group of mercenaries who call themselves The Raven. The trilogy consists of three novels:
 Dawnthief
 Noonshade
 Nightchild

The events of Legends of the Raven continue on from the events of Chronicles of the Raven and consists of another three novels:
 Elfsorrow
 Shadowheart
 Demonstorm

The story is picked back up 10 years after the end of Demonstorm many of the previous characters are brought back
Ravensoul

His two trilogies are both published by Victor Gollancz Ltd.

Light Stealer is set in the same world as the above trilogies, but set several hundred years previously. The events revolve around a famous mage named Septern who is mentioned many times in the trilogies. Light Stealer is published by PS Publishing.

Barclay has stated on numerous occasions that he is unlikely to write any more books regarding The Raven, however he has stated on his online forum that he is interested in writing an encyclopaedia on the world of The Raven. But in 2008 he released Ravensoul which brings back many of the previous characters for one final battle.

On 18 July Barclay announced he is writing a seventh Raven book titled Ravensoul, quoted in the news section of his site "Ravensoul is about how honour and love transcend the boundary of life and death; and how greed and the lust for power can put at risk the lives, and deaths, of everyone."

An origin story of the company of The Raven entitled "Or so Legend Has It" can be found in "Legends", a 2013 collection of short stories in honour of David Gemmell.

The Ascendants

The Ascendants of Estorea, departs from the world of Balaia. The titles of the two books are:
 Cry of the Newborn
 Shout for the Dead

Elves
Set on Calaius, the southern continent of Balaia, this trilogy tells the story of the elves' history and the creation of the spell Dawnthief by Septern:
 Once Walked With Gods, set 3,000 years before the events of The Raven.
 Rise of the TaiGethen
 Beyond the Mists of Katura

Online presence

Barclay runs an official website (below) which contains his biography, a bibliography, latest extract, and also an online blog.

He also participates and encourages discussion regarding his books on his online forum, which to date (March 2007) has just over 300 members.

The forum has recently been changed and updated. It is a growing community, and its members have referred to themselves as "Ravenites" and "Forumites" and James acknowledged these members as "Forumites" in the dedications for his book, Cry of the Newborn.

External links
 Official website
 Interview with James Barclay
  Fansite for The Ascendants of Estorea
 James's sports blog
 Novel synopses, cover art, and reviews at FantasyLiterature.net

1965 births
Living people
21st-century English novelists
English fantasy writers
English bloggers
English male short story writers
English short story writers
English male novelists
21st-century British short story writers
21st-century English male writers
British male bloggers